The 1946 United States Senate election in Indiana took place on November 5, 1946. Incumbent Republican U.S. Senator Raymond E. Willis did not run for re-election. Former interim Senator William E. Jenner was elected over Governor of Indiana M. Clifford Townsend.

Republican nomination

Candidates
William E. Jenner, former U.S. Senator (1944–45) and State Senator from Martin County
Charles M. La Follette, U.S. Representative from Evansville

Withdrew
Raymond E. Willis, incumbent Senator since 1941 (withdrew at convention)

Convention results

General election

Candidates
William E. Jenner, former interim U.S. Senator (Republican)
Elmer G. Johnson (Communist)
John Marion Morris (Socialist Labor)
M. Clifford Townsend, former Governor of Indiana (Democratic)
 Elmer D. Riggs (Prohibition)

Results

See also 
 1946 United States Senate elections

References

Indiana
1946
1946 Indiana elections